Alexander Southayke BD (died 1606) was a Canon of Windsor from 1586 to 1606

Career
He was educated at Trinity College, Cambridge and graduated BA in 1571, MA in 1574 and BD in 1581.

He was appointed:
Rector of Waddington, Lincolnshire 1588

He was appointed to the fourth stall in St George's Chapel, Windsor Castle in 1586 and held the canonry until 1606.

Notes 

1606 deaths
Canons of Windsor
Alumni of Trinity College, Cambridge
Year of birth missing